Tan Tolga Demirci (born 31 December 1974, in İstanbul) is a director, writer. He graduated from Cinematography at Dokuz Eylül University in 1996. In the meantime, he has written an extended essay named The Psychoanalysis of Horror Genre. This thesis has become a book in 2006.

Filmography

Notes

External links 
 

1974 births
21st-century Turkish writers
Turkish film directors
Turkish surreal artists
Surrealist filmmakers
Living people